Ireland competed at the 1928 Summer Olympics in Amsterdam, Netherlands. 38 competitors, 33 men and 5 women, took part in 27 events in 6 sports. Ireland won its first Olympic medal as an independent nation as Pat O'Callaghan won the gold medal in the men's hammer throw.

Medalists

Athletics

Boxing

Men's Flyweight (– 50.8 kg)
 Myles McDonagh
 First Round — Bye Second Round — Lost to Ben Bril (HOL), points

Men's Lightweight (-61.2 kg)
 William O'Shea
 First Round - Lost to Jorge Diaz (CHI), points

See full results Boxing at the 1928 Summer Olympics – Men's lightweight

Men's Heavyweight (+ 79.4 kg)
 Matthew Flanagan
 First Round — Lost to Arturo Rodríguez (ARG), KO-1

Cycling

Two cyclists, both men, competed for Ireland in 1928.

Individual road race
 John Woodcock

Sprint
 Bertie Donnelly

Time trial
 Bertie Donnelly

Swimming

Water polo

Arts competitions

References

External links
Official Olympic Reports
International Olympic Committee results database

Nations at the 1928 Summer Olympics
1928
1928 in Irish sport